The 2020–21 Texas Longhorns men's basketball team represented the University of Texas at Austin in the 2020–21 NCAA Division I men's basketball season. They were led by sixth-year head coach Shaka Smart and played their home games at the Frank Erwin Center in Austin, Texas as members of the Big 12 Conference. They finished the season 19–8, 11–6 in Big 12 play to finish in a tie for third place. As the No. 3 seed in the Big 12 tournament, they defeated Texas Tech in the first round and advanced to the tournament championship game due to COVID-19 issues at Kansas. There they defeated Oklahoma State to win the Big 12 Tournament championship. As a result, they received the conference's automatic bid to the NCAA tournament as the No. 3 seed in the East region. They were upset in the First Round by Abilene Christian.

On March 26, 2021, head coach Shaka Smart left the school to take the head coaching job at Marquette. Shortly thereafter, the school named Texas Tech coach Chris Beard the team's new head coach.

Previous season
The Longhorns finished the 2019–20 season 19–12, and 9–9 in Big 12 play. They were slated to play Texas Tech in the quarterfinals of the Big 12 tournament but the tournament was canceled before the quarterfinals due to the COVID-19 pandemic. The NCAA tournament, National Invitation Tournament, and all other postseason tournaments were also canceled due to the pandemic.

Offseason

Departures

2020 recruiting class

2021 Recruiting class

Roster

Schedule and results
Source:

|-
!colspan=9 style=|Regular season

|-
!colspan=9 style=|Big 12 Tournament

|-
!colspan=9 style=|NCAA tournament

Player statistics

* – Recorded statistics when playing for Texas

| Andrew Jones
| 19|| 19|| 31.7 || .406|| .302|| .807|| 5.0|| 2.11 || 1.11 || 0.11|| 15.4
|-
|Courtney Ramey
| 19|| 19|| 34.4 || .417|| .437|| .831|| 2.8|| 3.95 || 0.95 || 0.11|| 14.1
|-
|Matt Coleman III
| 20|| 20|| 34.4 || .476|| .353|| .800|| 3.9|| 4.25 ||1.20 || 0.10|| 13.0
|-
|Greg Brown
| 19|| 19|| 22.5 || .426|| .351|| .672|| 7.4|| 0.26 || 0.63 || 1.11|| 10.9
|-
|Kai Jones
| 19|| 2|| 22.7 || .582|| .423|| .660|| 4.8|| 0.74 || 0.95 || 0.74|| 8.2
|-
|Jericho Sims
| 19|| 19|| 23.5 || .640|| .000|| .520|| 6.8|| 0.58 || 0.58 || 0.84|| 8.1
|-
|Donovan Williams
| 12|| 0|| 12.3 || .327|| .174|| .846|| 1.2|| 0.25 || 0.42 || 0.25|| 4.1
|-
|Kamaka Hepa
| 7|| 1|| 7.6 || .471|| .500|| .000|| 1.0|| 0.14 || 0.14 || 0.29|| 3.4
|-
|Jase Febres
| 6|| 0|| 14.1 || .286|| .263|| .000|| 1.7|| 0.67 || 0.50 || .50|| 2.0
|-
|Royce Hamm Jr.
| 16|| 1|| 10.4 || .559|| .500|| .300|| 2.9|| 0.19 || 0.13 || 0.50|| 2.6
|-
|Gerald Liddell
| 7|| 0|| 11.5 || .429|| .286|| .167|| 1.7|| 0.43 || 0.14 || 0.14|| 2.1
|-
|Brock Cunningham
| 18|| 0|| 16.8 || .237|| .233|| .333|| 3.4|| 0.94 || 0.89 || 0.11|| 1.4
|-
|Blake Nevins
| 2|| 0|| 0.6 || .500|| .000|| .000|| 0.0|| 0.0 || 0.0 || 0.0|| 0.0
|-
|Andrew Deutser
| 1|| 0|| 1.1 || .000|| .000|| .000|| 0.0|| 0.0 || 0.0 || 0.0|| 0.0
|-
|Drayton Whiteside
| 2|| 0|| 0.9 || .000|| .000|| .000|| 0.0|| 0.0 || 0.0 || 0.0|| 0.0
|
|}

Rankings

^Coaches did not release a Week 1 poll.

Notes

References

Texas
Longhorns
Longhorns
Texas Longhorns men's basketball seasons
Texas